is the 9th single by the Japanese female idol group Momoiro Clover Z, released in Japan on November 21, 2012. The title track became the group's first song to top the Billboard Japan Hot 100 chart.

Release 
The single was released in two versions: a limited edition and a regular edition. The limited edition comes with a DVD featuring the music video for the title track, but contains fewer songs on the CD in comparison to the regular CD-only edition.

Music 
The title track is a theme song of the Nippon Television family drama series Akumu-chan starring Keiko Kitagawa. The song is composed and arranged by Tomoyasu Hotei.

The regular edition's B-side "Wee-Tee-Wee-Tee" is sung in Japanese and Furbish. It is an advertising song for Furbies. The word wee-tee means "sing" in the Furbish language, and the title is translated in different Japanese news publications as either "Sing, Sing" or "Let's Sing!".

Cover art and music video 
The cover's theme is "good and evil". On the regular edition's cover the Momoiro Clover members are wearing white costumes and on the limited edition's — black, representing two outlooks on the world.

The music video for the title track elaborates further on the song's theme. In it, the girls are also wearing two types of clothes, black and white. They change between angel and demon costumes when switch between the voice of their conscience and the whispers of Satan. The video was directed by Hideki Kuroda, who notably shot music videos for such artists as SMAP and Southern All Stars.

In the making of the video, electroluminescent wire costumes were used. The glowing outfits had radio control systems hidden in them.

Reception 
On its debut day, the CD single sold 32,889 copies and placed 3rd in the Oricon daily ranking. It proceeded to win the 2nd place in the Oricon Weekly Singles Chart, Momoclo's highest to date, selling 73,745 copies in that first week.

With digital sales of the song "Saraba, Itoshiki Kanashimitachi yo", Momoclo scored their first number 1 in the RecoChoku Daily Chart. The video for "Saraba, Itoshiki Kanashimitachi yo" also topped the Recochoku daily ranking, in the video clips category.

In the Billboard Japan Hot 100 chart, which is published weekly, the title track debuted at the first place.

Track listing

Limited edition

Regular edition

Chart performance

Awards 

|-
|rowspan="2" align="center"| 2013
|rowspan="2" align="center"| "Saraba, Itoshiki Kanashimitachi yo"
| Space Shower Music Video Awards — Special Award
| 
|-
| MTV Video Music Award Japan for Best Choreography
|

References

External links 
 CD single profile on the official site of Momoiro Clover Z

2012 singles
Japanese-language songs
Momoiro Clover Z songs
Japanese television drama theme songs
Billboard Japan Hot 100 number-one singles
King Records (Japan) singles
Songs written by Tomoyasu Hotei
2012 songs